The National Archives of Norway (Riksarkivet) is the institution responsible for preserving archive material from Norwegian state institutions, as well as contributing to the preservation of private archives. It does this work in cooperation with the regional state archives, together with which it forms the National Archival Services of Norway (Arkivverket).

The National Archives was founded in 1817. Henrik Wergeland was appointed as the first national archivist in 1841.

References

External links

Norway
Norwegian culture
1817 establishments in Norway
Buildings and structures in Oslo
Heraldic authorities
National Archival Services of Norway